Brandur is a Faroese and Icelandic masculine given name. People bearing the name Brandur include:
Brandur Brynjólfsson (1916–1999), Icelandic footballer
Brandur Enni (born 1989), Faroese singer, songwriter, composer, and musician
Brandur Olsen (born 1995), Faroese footballer
Brandur Sandoy (born 1973), Faroese politician

References

Faroese masculine given names
Icelandic masculine given names